This List of National Fish Hatcheries in the United States includes the 70 National Fish Hatcheries, seven Fish Technology Centers and nine Fish Health Centers that are administered as components of the National Fish Hatchery System by the U.S. Fish and Wildlife Service.

References
 National Fish Hatcheries - U.S. Fish & Wildlife Service

Fish Hatcheries, List